The 33rd International Emmy Awards took place on November 21, 2005, at the Hilton Hotel in New York City, United States and hosted by Irish comedian Graham Norton. The International Academy have introduced two new categories for this year’s ceremony; Best Performance by an Actor and Best Performance by an Actress.

Ceremony 
37 TV shows from 10 countries were nominated in nine categories for the 33rd International Emmy Awards, Russia for the first time disputed the award in the drama series category. The nominees were selected over six months, by 500 judges representing 35 countries.

Denmark which has won the best drama award three out of the past four years, received Emmys in both the drama and miniseries categories for crime drama The Eagle, and miniseries Young Andersen, about storyteller Hans Christian Andersen.

Canadian TV series The Newsroom beat BBC show Little Britain, among others, to the comedy award while Canada's Dark Oracle won in the children and young people category.

Long-running BBC Two series Top Gear won the Emmy for best non-scripted entertainment, and documentary Holocaust – A Musical Memorial Film from Auschwitz scooped a best arts programming award for BBC.

In the performance category – a recent addition to the awards – Thierry Frémont won the best actor award by the French television film Dans la tête du tueur, beating Little Britain's David Walliams and Rhys Ifans, who played Peter Cook in Not Only But Always.

German production Das Drama von Dresden was named best documentary while the best actress prize went to China's He Lin for her performance in Slave Mother.

In addition to the presentation of the International Emmy Awards for programming and performances, the Academy presented two special awards. Oprah Winfrey received the Founders Award for her philanthropic initiatives in international broadcasting career, and the British broadcaster ITV received the 2005 International Emmy Directorate Award for outstanding contributions to the television industry.

Winners

Most major nominations 
By country

 — 13
 — 3
 — 3
 — 3
 —  3
 — 2
 — 2
 — 1
 — 1
 — 1
 — 1
 — 1
 — 1

By network

BBC — 9
Rede Globo — 3
SVT — 3
Channel 4 — 2
DR — 2
TF1 — 2
ARD — 1 
Canal 13 — 1
CBC — 1  
CCTV — 1
Channel One Russia — 1
Cuatro Cabezas — 1
GmbH — 1
ITV — 1
NPS — 1  
NRK — 1
TV 2 Zulu — 1
YTV — 1
ZDF — 1

Most major awards 
By country
 — 3
 — 2

By network
BBC — 2
DR —  2

References

External links 
 
 Emmy Internacional não premia indicados brasileiros

International Emmy Awards ceremonies
2005 television awards
2005 in American television